Qaleh Khiaban (also Romanized as Qal‘eh Khīābān) is a village in Meyami Rural District, Razaviyeh District, Mashhad County, Razavi Khorasan Province, Iran. At the 2006 census, its population was 25,666, in 5,727 families.

References 

Populated places in Mashhad County